The 2016–17 Regional Super50 was the 43rd edition of the Regional Super50, the domestic limited-overs cricket competition for the countries of the West Indies Cricket Board (WICB). The tournament was held in Antigua and Barbuda.

Ten teams participated in the competition – the six regular teams of West Indian domestic cricket (Barbados, Guyana, Jamaica, the Leeward Islands, Trinidad and Tobago, and the Windward Islands), two development teams (Combined Campuses and Colleges and ICC Americas), the West Indies under-19 cricket team and the English side Kent County Cricket Club.

Kent accepted an invitation from the WICB to play in the tournament, the first time that any English county side had competed in an overseas domestic tournament. The invitation was partly due to the influence of former West Indian captain Jimmy Adams who, until September 2016, had been Head Coach of the county.

Following the conclusion of the group stage, Trinidad & Tobago and the Leeward Islands progressed to the semi-finals from Group A, while Barbados and Jamaica progressed from Group B. In the first semi-final, Jamaica beat Trinidad & Tobago by 292 runs, after they made 434 for 4, the highest total in the history of the Regional Super50. In the second semi-final, Barbados beat the Leeward Islands by 110 runs, to make their second successive appearance in the final of the Regional Super50. Barbados won the final, beating Jamaica by 59 runs.

Squads

In December 2016, Steven Taylor was named in the ICC Americas' squad. However, in January 2017 he moved to Jamaica's team for the tournament. Akeem Dodson was later named as Taylor's replacement. Fahad Babar left the ICC Americas squad midway through the competition because of immigration worries, following the executive order issued by Donald Trump.

Points tables
In the group stage of the tournament four points were awarded for each match a team won, with two points awarded to both teams if a match ends in a tie or if there is no result declared. A bonus point was awarded to a team if they won a match with a run rate of 1.25 that of the opposition team.

Group A

Group B

The top two teams from each group qualified for the playoff stage of the tournament.

Fixtures

Group A

Group B

Finals

References

External links
 Series home at ESPN Cricinfo

2017 in West Indian cricket
Regional Super50
Regional Super50 seasons